Yvonne Lim (born 28 September 1976) is a Singaporean actress.

Early life and education
Lim was born to Hokkien-speaking family. She studied at CHIJ St Theresa's Convent and graduated with a Diploma in Electronic, Computer & Communication Engineering (DECC) at Singapore Polytechnic in 1996. 

In an interview with SP's alumni magazine, she stated that she was a "shy girl" who rarely took part in extracurricular activities. At the recommendation of some friends, she took part in the Miss Singapore Polytechnic beauty pageant and finished first runner-up. She was a finalist with Go Magazine's Cover Girl Contest and did some modelling before joining Star Search Singapore 1997. While she was eliminated in the finals but she was offered a contract by the Television Corporation of Singapore (predecessor of MediaCorp).

Career
Lim was given a lead role in Starting Point, where she played a young entrepreneur, and was well received by audiences. She was nominated for Best Newcomer and Top 10 Most Popular Female Artistes in the Star Awards 1998 after her debut Starting Point. Although she did not manage to win the 'Best Newcomer 1998', she was voted into the Top 10 Most Popular Female Artistes for that year.

Her subsequent progress was fairly slow, mainly appearing in minor supporting roles (A Child's Hope, The Vagrant). Some attribute this trend to her petite build, which dwarf her in comparison to other actresses. However, her career started to pick up again in 1999 with her role of an unfortunate girl lost in the crowds of Singapore in the early 20th century in Stepping Out.

She also recorded and released a solo Mandarin album in the year 2000. In 2002, she participated in the Hong Kong television station ATV 30-part courtroom drama Innocently Guilty, which also starred Anita Yuen, Kent Cheng and Felix Wong.

In 2005, she landed major roles in popular dramas such as A New Life, where she played a poor but contented woman, and Portrait of Home, in which she played one of the antagonists. At the Star Awards 2005, she had the rare honour of being nominated in both acting categories and won the Best Supporting Actress for the latter. That drama's role as a vengeful woman was also named one of the top 10 most memorable villains at the Star Awards 2007 25th anniversary special.

In 2006, her stock rose even further when she landed the lead role in An Enchanted Life, a story of a Taiwanese betel nut seller who journeys to Singapore in search of her long-lost father. She also starred in the hit drama Metamorphosis in 2007, which granted her the coveted Star Awards 2007 Best Actress Award. This award was an important milestone for her as it led to her rising popularity. Metamorphosis also won Best TV Serial in the Star Awards 2007.

Lim appeared on numerous variety and game shows, including 'Let's Party With Food!' and 'The Giant Show' in 2008, after her win for Best Actress in the Star Awards 2007.

Lim has been nominated for 'Top 10 Most Popular Female Artistes' in the Star Awards for every single year since she joined Mediacorp in 1998. After her first win in 1998, she did not win the Top 10 award until 2009.

In 2012, Lim signed with Lafeng Entertainment 拉风娱乐, a China Management Company. Her contract with Lafeng has ended, but she still has a valid contract with MediaCorp.

In 2014, Lim said she will only be taking a break and not leaving permanently from her acting career to move to Taiwan with her family. 

Lim co-stars with local actor Shaun Chen in While You Were Away, and this will be their third drama in which they rekindle their on-screen romance. They were previously an on-screen couple for Channel 8's Your Hand in Mine in 2009 and Kampong Ties in 2011.

Personal life
Lim is married to former Taiwanese boy band B.A.D member, Alex Tien, who is 3 years younger than her. The couple held their wedding on 7 September 2014 at Ritz Carlton Hotel, Singapore. On 27 December 2014, she gave birth to her son Alex Junior aka A.J. at the Mount Elizabeth Hospital, and after which they moved to Taiwan on 25 May 2015. On 6 January 2017, she gave birth to her second child, a daughter, Alexa in Taiwan. As of 2018, Alexa acquired her Singapore citizenship. Lim is in the process of moving her family back to Singapore.

In 2019, Lim who is currently based in Taipei, expressed her happiness during an interview claiming that she has "achieved success" with Alex "finally being able to see the good sides of Singapore." The star said that her husband wishes to apply for permanent residency and is considering the option of relocating here. However, it would not be so soon, "perhaps in three to four years' time," she added. The family of four had previously lived in Singapore for a month as Yvonne filmed her comeback drama, While You Were Away. Her son AJ, also attended preschool here. For now though, Lim is the only one still in town. Her husband returned to Taiwan two months ago with their two children and became a stay-at-home dad. Despite the seemingly perfect arrangement, Lim has a "complaint" - Alex has taken care of the children "too well and they seem to not miss her. Sometimes we do video calls twice a day, but the children thought it was too much. It makes me a little sad."

Filmography

Film

Television

Compilation album

Awards and nominations

References

External links 
 Profile on xin.msn.com
 Personal Blog

Living people
20th-century Singaporean actresses
21st-century Singaporean actresses
Singaporean television actresses
Singaporean people of Hokkien descent
Singapore Polytechnic alumni
1976 births